The Mooney Mooney Creek, a perennial river that is part of the Hawkesbury-Nepean catchment, is located in the Central Coast region of New South Wales, Australia.

Course and features
The Mooney Mooney Creek rises southeast of Central Mangrove below Peats Ridge, and flows generally south before reaching its confluence with the Hawkesbury River at the locality of Mooney Mooney. The river descends  over its  course.

Although called a creek, the watercourse is designated as a river, and is impounded by the Mooney Mooney Upper Dam, below Mount White. The Pacific Motorway, via the Mooney Mooney Bridge, and the Central Coast Highway crosses the river, both east of the Calga interchange.

See also 

 List of rivers of Australia
 List of rivers of New South Wales (L–Z)
 Mooney Mooney Bridge
 Rivers of New South Wales

References 

Rivers of New South Wales
Central Coast (New South Wales)
Hawkesbury River
Central Coast Council (New South Wales)